He Leads, Others Follow is a 1919 American short comedy film starring Harold Lloyd. It is presumed to be lost.

Cast
 Harold Lloyd 
 Snub Pollard 
 Bebe Daniels  
 Sammy Brooks
 Lige Conley (as Lige Cromley)
 Charles Inslee
 Dee Lampton
 Marie Mosquini
 Fred C. Newmeyer (as Fred Newmeyer)
 Billie Oakley
 H.L. O'Connor
 Charles Stevenson (as Charles E. Stevenson)
 Noah Young

See also
Harold Lloyd filmography
List of lost films

References

External links

1919 films
1919 comedy films
1919 short films
1919 lost films
American silent short films
American black-and-white films
Films directed by Hal Roach
Lost American films
Silent American comedy films
Films with screenplays by H. M. Walker
American comedy short films
Lost comedy films
1910s American films